Paul George Hyman, Jr. (born September 17, 1952) is a judge for the United States bankruptcy court, Southern District of Florida.  He was formerly Chief judge.

Early life and education 
Paul G. Hyman received a Bachelor degree in economics from Vanderbilt University in 1974. He received a Juris Doctor in 1977 from the University of Miami School of Law.

Legal career
Paul Hyman began his legal career as an assistant attorney for the Britton Cohen Kaufman & Schantz from 1977 to 1979, practicing commercial litigation. 
In 1979, he became an Assistant United States Attorney for the Southern District of Florida. In 1981, he returned to Britton Cohen Kaufman & Schantz, where he represented debtors, creditors and trustees in all types of bankruptcy proceedings. 
In 1983, he moved to Denver to join the firm of Holme Roberts & Owens where he continued his bankruptcy practice representing United Bank of Colorado and large corporate debtors in their Chapter 11 proceedings. He became a partner at Holme Roberts in January 1986.

In October 1993,  Judge Hyman was nominated to serve as a United States District Judge of the Southern District of Florida and became Chief Judge in 2006.

Judge Paul Hyman has presided over many notable cases including Southeast Banking Corp., SunCruz Casinos, Burt Reynolds Production, Palm Beach Princess Cruises, Palm Beach Finance Partners, Mercedes Homes, Ginn-LA St. Lucie and Marc H. Roberts.

Juge Paul G. Hyman Jr.  serves as the co-chairperson of the Bankruptcy Judicial Liaison Committee and as a member of the Business Law Section's executive council and the Archives and History Committee of the Florida Bar for approximately 15 years.

Paul Hyman served as Chief Judge of the United States Bankruptcy Court for the Southern District of Florida from October 1, 2005, to September 30, 2015.

On January 3, 2018, Hyman retired and began serving as a recalled Judge for the Southern District of Florida for the purpose of conducting settlement conferences.

Personal life
Paul G.  Hyman Jr,  was married to attorney Judy Hyman, who died in 2010. Paul Hyman is father to two children, twins Zachary Hyman and Kaylee Rose Hyman. Hyman 

Paul Hyman later married Kelly A. Hyman, a former actress ,  who has been called by Forbes as a "a modern day Erin Brockovitch" who is an Australian- American lawyer, media commentary and Television legal analyst.

References

Living people
Vanderbilt University alumni
University of Miami School of Law alumni
1952 births
Judges of the United States bankruptcy courts